HMS Rosario (J219) was a turbine engine-powered  during the Second World War. She survived the war and was sold to Belgium in 1953 as De Moor (M905).

Design and description

The ships' complement consisted of 85 officers and ratings.

The reciprocating ships had two vertical triple-expansion steam engines, each driving one shaft, using steam provided by two Admiralty three-drum boilers.

The Algerine class was armed with a QF  Mk V anti-aircraft gun and four twin-gun mounts for Oerlikon 20 mm cannon. The latter guns were in short supply when the first ships were being completed and they often got a proportion of single mounts. By 1944, single-barrel Bofors 40 mm mounts began replacing the twin 20 mm mounts on a one for one basis. All of the ships were fitted for four throwers and two rails for depth charges.

Construction and career

Service in the Royal Navy 
The ship was ordered on 15 November 1940 at the Harland & Wolff at Belfast, Ireland. She was laid down on 22 September 1942 and launched on 3 April 1943. She was commissioned on 9 July 1943. S

Rosario was decommissioned in 1947.

She was then sold to Belgium in 1953.

Service in the Belgian Navy 
Rosario was renamed De Moor and was commissioned on 15 January 1953.

On 4 April 1967, the ship left Oostende for Australia on a 6 month scientific expedition. She made multiple port calls to Tunis, Port Said, Massawa, Colombo, Djakarta, Fremantle, Melbourne, Sydney, Brisbane, Cairns, Gladstone, Townsville, Darwin, Singapore, Cochin, Diego Suarez, Cape town, Abidjan and Tenerife. She returned back to Oostende on 20 February 1968. The ship had to return through South Africa due to the ongoing War of Attrition between Egypt and Israel.

The ship was decommissioned in 1969 and sold for scrap in Bruges, 1970.

References

Bibliography
 
 
 Peter Elliott (1977) Allied Escort Ships of World War II. MacDonald & Janes,

External links
 

 

Algerine-class minesweepers of the Royal Navy
Ships built in Belfast
1943 ships
World War II minesweepers of the United Kingdom
Algerine-class minesweepers of the Belgian Navy